is a public park for viewing nature in Kita Ward, Tokyo, Japan.

History
The park opened on 1 April 1999. There are springs in the park, and they have been utilized to restore the nature that was once seen in this area. The park is maintained so that the visitors can observe and touch nature, as shown in the name of the park. Admission is free.

Facilities
Acorn forest
Paddy field
Spring water (one of the famous spring waters in Tokyo)
Day camp field (barbecues possible; permission required)
Multipurpose square (permission required)
Forest of Peace
Kita Ward’s Hometown & Farmhouse Experience Hall—A tangible cultural property designated by Kita Ward
Parking for cars (park office needs to be contacted in advance)

Access
By train:
13 minutes’ walk from the West Exit of Akabane Station
13 minutes’ walk from Motohasunuma Station on the  Toei Mita Line

Gallery

See also
 Parks and gardens in Tokyo
 National Parks of Japan

References

 Website of actindi Inc.

External links
 Kita City website (in Japanese)
Parks and gardens in Tokyo